Soul is a 2020 American computer-animated film written and directed by Pete Docter. It features the voice of Jamie Foxx as Joe Gardner, a middle school music teacher who seeks to reunite his soul and his body after he unexpectedly dies before his big break as a jazz musician. Tina Fey also stars as the voice of 22, a soul with a pessimistic view of life that Gardner tries to inspire to go to Earth.

The film premiered at the London Film Festival on October 11, 2020, and was scheduled to be theatrically released on November 20. However, the feature was postponed due to the COVID-19 pandemic, with Soul being released direct-to-streaming on Disney+ on December 25, 2020, and in theaters in countries without the streaming service. , Soul has grossed $116.2 million at the worldwide box office. Rotten Tomatoes, a review aggregator, surveyed  reviews and judged  of them to be positive.

Upon release, Soul was met with significant buzz and garnered a variety of awards and nominations, many in the animated and music categories. At the Annie Awards, the film received ten nominations, winning for Best Animated Feature, Best FX, Best Character Animation, and Best Music. At the 1st Critics' Choice Super Awards, it also won for Best Animated Movie, while Foxx and Fey both won awards for their voice acting in the film. With nine nominations at the NAACP Image Awards ceremony, the film received four awards, two for its music and soundtrack. At the 93rd Academy Awards, Soul earned three nominations, including for Best Sound, and won Best Score along with the Academy Award for Best Animated Feature.

Accolades

References

External links
 

Lists of accolades by film
Pixar awards and nominations